Oligoporus parvus is a species of fungus belonging to the family Dacryobolaceae.

Synonym:
 Oligoporus parvus Renvall, 2005 (= basionym)

References

Polyporales